Brucemore, a park-like,  estate in the heart of Cedar Rapids, Iowa, is the site of a Queen Anne-style mansion, formal gardens, a children's garden, night garden, pond, orchard, and woodland. Built between 1884 and 1886 by Caroline Sinclair, widow of pioneer industrialist T.M. Sinclair, Brucemore has been home to three prominent families who used the estate as a center for culture and the arts. Brucemore, whose name alludes to the Scottish moors of the second owner's ancestral home, is Iowa's only National Trust Historic Site and is preserved by the National Trust for Historic Preservation in co-stewardship with Brucemore, Inc. Under the name of the T.M. Sinclair Mansion, it is listed on the National Register of Historic Places. The mansion has three stories, and contains twenty-one rooms. Distinctive features include a steeply gabled roof, five chimneys, and several turrets.

History
Brucemore is the story of three wealthy families: industrialists, entrepreneurs, philanthropists, boosters, neighbors, and friends.  The men created great fortunes: Thomas Sinclair in meatpacking; George Bruce Douglas in starch processing; and Howard Hall in manufacturing. However, the women of Brucemore are at the heart of the story; Caroline Sinclair built the mansion; Irene Douglas transformed it to a country estate; and Margaret Hall gave it to the National Trust.

The Sinclairs (1886–1906)
In 1871, Thomas McElderry and Caroline Soutter Sinclair moved to Cedar Rapids from New York City. Thomas started a meatpacking business, the T.M. Sinclair & Co., which became the city's largest business. Sinclair died in an 1881 accident at the plant, leaving Caroline to bring up their six children, the youngest aged just six months. In 1884, Caroline Sinclair purchased land that was then beyond the city limits and started to build a Queen Anne-style mansion she named "Fairhome."

The home was designed by Maximillian Allardt, an Indianapolis architect. When his daughter fell ill, Allardt left the job, and Henry Josselyn and Eugene Taylor continued where he left off. The original plan for the house included a great hall, eight bathrooms, nine bedrooms, fourteen fireplaces, and a grand staircase. Sinclair added a conservatory to the south side of the house.

Completed in 1886 for $55,000, the home was described as "the grandest house west of Chicago" to the local paper.

In 1906, when all her children had grown, Caroline traded homes with George Bruce Douglas, and moved to 800 Second Ave SE.

The Douglases (1906–1937)
George Bruce Douglas was a partner in his father's business, the Quaker Oats Company. George moved into the home with his wife Irene, and daughters Margaret and Ellen and renamed it Brucemore. He also moved the entrance to the south side. The interior was also upgraded, with exposed ceiling beams and butternut paneling added to the great hall. This expansion cost over $30,000 and was designed by Howard Van Doren Shaw, a Chicago architect known for his North Shore mansions. In the 1920s, a mural was added that showed the story of "The Ring of the Nibelung" from Richard Wagner. A 714-pipe organ from the Skinner company was added to the third floor. In 1925, Grant Wood designed a sleeping porch which was added to the house. In 1927, a swimming pool was added.

In 1923, George died. Fourteen years later, Irene followed him and willed the home to their oldest daughter Margaret.

The Halls (1937–1981)
Margaret Douglas married Howard Hall in 1924. The couple lived on the Brucemore grounds, residing in the Garden House from the start of their marriage until the death of Margaret's mother.  While they lived there, they sold off some of the property, reducing the estate to its current .  They also enclosed the western porch, and added picture windows to the master bedroom, the library, and the dining room. In two of their more unusual enhancements to the house, the Halls added two basement recreation rooms, "The Tahitian Room", and a "Grizzly Bar". The Tahitian room is designed to resemble a tropical island, including a faux hut roof, and a switch that can create artificial rain. The Grizzly room is decorated like a Wild West or Alaskan saloon.

The Halls kept several pets on the property, including two German shepherds, a monkey and several birds. But their most famous pets were three lions, all named Leo. Jackie, the lion that roars at the beginning of MGM movies, is related to one of the Leos. One of the lions as well as 20 dogs are buried in the pet cemetery near the gardens.

All of Brucemore's residents used their wealth and standing to promote the community that had supported them. When Margaret died in 1981, she bequeathed Brucemore to the National Trust for Historic Preservation.

Community cultural center
Today, Brucemore is a hub of cultural, philanthropic, and educational activities, welcoming 40,000 people each year to a variety of events, including festivals, concerts, tours, garden programs, children and family activities, outdoor theater, and more.

References

External links
 Brucemore's website
 National Trust for Historic Preservation
 Back Stairs at Brucemore:Life as Servants in early 20th-Century America, a National Park Service Teaching with Historic Places (TwHP) lesson plan

Houses on the National Register of Historic Places in Iowa
Historic house museums in Iowa
Museums in Cedar Rapids, Iowa
National Register of Historic Places in Cedar Rapids, Iowa
Howard Van Doren Shaw buildings
National Trust for Historic Preservation
Houses in Cedar Rapids, Iowa